Sully Springs is an unincorporated community in Billings County, North Dakota, United States.

References

Unincorporated communities in North Dakota
Unincorporated communities in Billings County, North Dakota